Elliot Soto (born August 21, 1989) is an American professional baseball infielder in the Minnesota Twins organization. He has played in Major League Baseball (MLB) for the Los Angeles Angels. After spending 10 seasons in the minors, Soto made his major league debut on September 25, 2020.

Amateur career
A native of Elgin, Illinois, Soto attended Dundee-Crown High School. He was selected by the Minnesota Twins in the 13th round of the 2007 MLB Draft, but chose to attend Creighton University, where he played college baseball for the Creighton Bluejays. In 2009, he played collegiate summer baseball with the Hyannis Mets of the Cape Cod Baseball League. He was selected by the Chicago Cubs in the 15th round of the 2010 MLB Draft.

Career

Chicago Cubs
Soto spent his first year in the minors primarily with the Class A Short Season Boise Hawks, but had briefs stints in Rookie and Class A ball for the Cubs. In 52 games that year, he hit .272. In 2011, Soto appeared in 112 games combined between Class A Peoria and Class-A Advanced Daytona, hitting .271.

In 2012, Soto was promoted to Double-A where he spent the majority of the season with the Tennessee Smokies, hitting .220/.310/.282 in 82 games. In 2013, Soto split time between Tennessee and Daytona hitting .219 with 2 home runs in 84 games. Soto got promoted to Triple-A Iowa in 2014, and .241 in a 29-game stint with the Cubs.

Miami Marlins
On July 31, 2015, Soto was traded to the Miami Marlins along with RHP Ivan Pineyro for RHP Dan Haren. He spent the entire 2015 season at the Double-A level, hitting .256/.366/.292 in 120 games. Soto spent his entire 2016 season with the New Orleans Zephyrs, hitting .241 in 62 games.

Second Cubs stint
Soto elected free agency following the 2016 season and signed back with the Chicago Cubs on a minor league deal. For the 2017 season, Soto played all his 81 games with Triple-A Iowa, and hit .238 with 2 home runs.

Colorado Rockies
That offseason, Soto briefly signed with Acereros del Norte of the Mexican League before signing with the Colorado Rockies. He played the 2018 season in Triple-A Albuquerque, hitting .286/.347/.382 over 81 games. He returned to the Isotopes in 2019, where he had his best offensive season of his minor league career, which saw Soto hit .305 with an .860 OPS and a career high 10 home runs in 112 games.

Los Angeles Angels
Soto elected free agency following the 2019 season and signed a minor league deal with an invite to spring training with the Los Angeles Angels. On September 22, 2020, the Angels selected his contract following Andrelton Simmons’s decision to opt out of the rest of the shortened 2020 season. He made his debut on September 25, appearing as a pinch runner in a 9-5 Angels loss. The next day, he made his first career start, and after teammate Jahmai Jones notched his first career hit, Soto went back-to-back with a single in his first at bat, becoming the first pair in Angels history to record back-to-back first career hits. On October 30, 2020, Soto was outrighted off of the 40-man roster. He became a free agent on November 2, 2020.

Los Angeles Dodgers 
On December 18, 2020, Elliot Soto signed a minor-league deal with the Los Angeles Dodgers with an invite to Spring Training. He spent the entire season in Triple-A with the Oklahoma City Dodgers, where he hit .230 in 54 games. Soto became a free agent following the season.

Minnesota Twins
On February 21, 2022, Soto signed a minor league contract with the Minnesota Twins. He had his contract selected on June 13, 2022 and was designated for assignment the next day without appearing in a game. He cleared waivers and was outrighted to the Triple-A St. Paul Saints on June 16.

On November 23, 2022, the Twins re-signed Soto to a minor league deal.

References

External links

1989 births
Living people
Albuquerque Isotopes players
Arizona League Cubs players
Baseball players from Illinois
Boise Hawks players
Creighton Bluejays baseball players
Daytona Cubs players
Estrellas Orientales players
American expatriate baseball players in the Dominican Republic
Hyannis Harbor Hawks players
Iowa Cubs players
Jacksonville Suns players
Los Angeles Angels players
Major League Baseball infielders
Mesa Solar Sox players
New Orleans Zephyrs players
Peoria Chiefs players
Sportspeople from Elgin, Illinois
Tennessee Smokies players
United States national baseball team players
2015 WBSC Premier12 players
Oklahoma City Dodgers players
Arizona Complex League Dodgers players